In This Room is the third studio album by the band The 3rd and the Mortal.

This was the band's second and also last album with Ann-Mari Edvardsen on vocal duty. The band had also left the doom metal sound for a more "atmospheric" sound. The album was given positive reviews by newspapers such as Tidens Krav ("die throw" 5), Aftenposten, Jærbladet, Driva ("die throw" 5) and Hamar Arbeiderblad ("die throw" 5). More mediocre reviews were issued by Rogalands Avis, Adresseavisen, Nordlands Framtid ("die throw" 4) and VG ("die throw" 4).

Track listing

Personnel
Adapted from the album's liner notes.
 Rune Hoemsnes – Drums, percussion, and programming
 Bernt Rundberget – Bass guitars
 Ann-Mari Edvardsen – Vocals, keyboards, lyrics
 Trond Engum – Electric and acoustic guitars
 Geir Nilssen – Electric and acoustic guitars, grand piano, keyboards
 Finn Olav Holthe – Guitar treatments, keyboards, tapes, loops

Additional musicians
 Rudolv Vassgaier – Wurlitzer
 Stein Jørgen Øien – Filter synth
 Torsk – Egg

Production
 Tor Torsk Breivik – Producer
 Lars Lien – Producer
 Jon Marius Åreskjold – Programming
 Monika Edvsardsen - Photography
 Audun Strype - mastering
 Bror Frode Karlsson - artwork

References

1997 albums
The 3rd and the Mortal albums